The Department for Business and Trade (DBT) is a department of His Majesty's Government established on 7 February 2023 after a government reshuffle, the first by prime minister Rishi Sunak. The new department absorbed the functions of the former Department for International Trade (DIT) and some of the functions of the former Department for Business, Energy, and Industrial Strategy (BEIS).

The department is headed by the Secretary of State for Business and Trade assisted by a number of junior ministers. The present incumbent, and the first to hold the role, is Kemi Badenoch; she is also President of the Board of Trade and Minister for Women and Equalities. Badenoch was previously the final Secretary of State at DIT.

History
The department was established on 7 February 2023. It combines the business focused responsibilities of the former Department for Business, Energy and Industrial Strategy (BEIS), with the former Department for International Trade (DIT). The ministers and senior civil servants from DIT carried over to continue leading the new department.

The creation of the new department was described by Downing Street as an opportunity to provide "a single, coherent voice for business inside government, focused on growing the economy with better regulation, new trade deals abroad, and a renewed culture of enterprise at home".

Responsibilities
The department's focus was outlined by Downing St as follows:
Delivering economic growth opportunities across the economy.
Backing business by improving access to finance and delivering a pro-enterprise regulatory system; 
Promoting British businesses on the global stage and attracting high-value investment, including through high quality Free Trade Agreements with India and other priority partners.
Promoting competitive markets and addressing market distorting practises to support growth, whilst protecting consumers;
Championing free trade;
Ensuring economic security and supply chain resilience; 
Supporting economic growth and innovation by making the most of Brexit freedoms and removing unnecessary regulatory burdens;
Delivering legislation on setting minimum service levels for priority public service sectors and to review, reform, retain and/or repeal retained EU law by December 2023.

Ministers
Ministers in the department in February 2023:

The role of Minister of State for International Trade was downgraded, soon after Rishi Sunak became Prime Minister in October 2022, to the more junior rank of Parliamentary Under-Secretary. At the same time, Badenoch's assumption of the role of Minister for Women and Equalities saw the appointment of two additional Parliamentary Under-Secretaries to support this additional portfolio. Badenoch retained the portfolio for Women and Equalities when the department was dissolved and merged.

See also
Department for International Trade - preceding body from 2016 to 2023.
Department for Business, Energy, and Industrial Strategy - preceding body from 2016 to 2023.
Department of Trade and Industry - UK government department with a historically similar function from 1970 to 2007.

References

External links
Official webpage on GOV.UK.
Making Government Deliver: Updating the machinery of government for the world of today and of tomorrow policy paper forwarded by Rishi Sunak explaining the rationale for the department.

Business in the United Kingdom
Trade in the United Kingdom
Trade ministries
Ministries established in 2023
2023 establishments in the United Kingdom